This is the results breakdown of the local elections held in Aragon on 24 May 2015. The following tables show detailed results in the autonomous community's most populous municipalities, sorted alphabetically.

Opinion polls

Overall

City control
The following table lists party control in the most populous municipalities, including provincial capitals (shown in bold). Gains for a party are displayed with the cell's background shaded in that party's colour.

Municipalities

Calatayud
Population: 20,658

Huesca
Population: 52,555

Teruel
Population: 35,675

Zaragoza

Population: 666,058

See also
2015 Aragonese regional election

References

Aragon
2015